Papyrus is an open-source UML 2 tool based on Eclipse and licensed under the EPL. It has been developed by the Laboratory of Model Driven Engineering for Embedded Systems (LISE) which is a part of the French Alternative Energies and Atomic Energy Commission (CEA-List).

Papyrus can either be used as a standalone tool or as an Eclipse plugin. It provides support for Domain Specific Languages and SysML. Papyrus is designed to be easily extensible as it is based on the principle of UML Profiles.

UML2
Papyrus is a graphical editing tool for UML2 as defined by OMG. Papyrus provides support for UML profiles. Every part of Papyrus may be customized: model explorer, diagram editors, property editors, etc.

SysML
Papyrus also provides a complete support to SysML in order to enable model-based system engineering. It includes an implementation of the SysML static profile and the specific graphical editors required for SysML.

UML-RT
A variant of Papyrus, Papyrus for Real Time (Papyrus-RT), implements UML-RT, a Domain Specific Language (DSL) designed for realtime embedded systems development. UML-RT is a UML-based variant of Real-Time Object-Oriented Modeling (ROOM).

References

External links

 About CEA
Carnot Institute ARTS
Eclipse (software)
Free software
Free UML tools
French Alternative Energies and Atomic Energy Commission
Paris-Saclay University